Aminan Mahmud (born 9 June 1968) is a former Bruneian military officer who previously served as the 10th commander of the Royal Brunei Armed Forces from 2018 until 2020. He was also the 9th commander of the Royal Brunei Land Forces.

Education 
Aminan obtained the National Diploma Engineering and Foundation Degree of Engineering in Mechanical Engineering in 1989 in the United Kingdom, Junior Officer Management Course in 1994, Unit Security Officers in 1994 and Combat Intelligence Officer in 1995 in Singapore, Bachelor of Engineering in 1997 in the United Kingdom, All Arms Tactics in 1999 in Malaysia, Command and Staff Course in 2000 in Singapore, Royal College of Defence Studies in 2010 in United Kingdom and Leaders in Development in 2012 in United States.

Military career 
He graduated from the Training Institute Royal Brunei Armed Forces as a second lieutenant on December 20, 1987, and also attended the Officer Cadet Course in Singapore. During his time in service, he was appointed to several positions, which include infantry platoon commander, technical instructor at Training Institute, SO2 G1 of Royal Brunei Service Force, SO2 and military assistant to Commander of RBAF and senior management officer at the Office of Strategy Management MINDEF. From 2007 until 2009, he was the aide-de-camp to the sultan of Brunei, and later in 2010, he became the director at Directorate of Strategic Planning. On February 7, 2014, Aminan began his duty as the acting deputy commander of Royal Brunei Land Forces (RBLF). That same year on December 1, he became the 9th commander of the RBLF.

He was promoted to brigadier general on February 6, 2015, and to major general upon his appointment as Commander of the Royal Brunei Armed Forces on January 31, 2018. Pengiran Dato Paduka Seri Aminan retired from the armed forces on September 1, 2020. His position as Commander of Royal Brunei Armed Forces was succeeded by Major General (U) Dato Seri Pahlawan Haji Hamzah bin Haji Sahat.

Personal life 
Aminan Mahmud is married to Rasidah binti Brahim. They have three daughters together.

Honours

National 

 Order of Paduka Keberanian Laila Terbilang First Class (DPKT) – Dato Paduka Seri (2018)
  Order of Pahlawan Negara Brunei First Class (PSPNB) – Dato Seri Pahlawan (2015)
  Order of Seri Paduka Mahkota Brunei Second Class (DPMB) – Dato Paduka (2012)
  Silver Jubilee Medal – (5 October 1992)
  Golden Jubilee Medal – (5 October 2017)
  General Service Medal
  Long Service Medal (Armed Forces)
  Armed Forces Golden Jubilee Medal – (31 May 2011)

Foreign

  :
 Darjah Panglima Gagah Angkatan Tentera First Degree
 Honorary Airborne Wing of the 10th Paratrooper Brigade (10th PARA)
  :
 Combat Commander's Badge (Philippines)
  :
 Darjah Utama Bakti Cemerlang (DUBC)
 Pingat Jasa Gemilang (PJG)
  :
 Royal Thai Army Jump Wings
 Order of the Crown of Thailand First Class (GCCT) – (10 April 2021)

Effective dates of promotion

References

1968 births
Place of birth missing (living people)
Bruneian military personnel
Living people
Graduates of the Royal College of Defence Studies